Umar Usman Kadafur (born 31 May 1976) is a Nigerian politician who has served as deputy governor of Borno State since May 2019.

Kadafur had his early education at Mbulamel Primary School, Biu. He thereafter proceeded to Government Science Secondary School Monguno to obtain his secondary school leaving certificate. Much later, he furthered his studies at the University of Maiduguri, where he studied public administration.

Acting Governor
On 26 April 2021, Governor Babagana Umara Zulum, wrote to the Borno State House of Assembly requesting approval to appoint Kadafur as acting governor from 29 April to 19 May 2021. The members of the state assembly accepted this request.

References 

1976 births
Living people
All Progressives Congress politicians
People from Borno State